Alberto Arilla (24 December 1937 – 5 September 2021) was a Spanish tennis player. He usually partnered with his younger brother José Luis, Manuel Santana or Andrés Gimeno in Davis Cup competition, in which he played a total of 8 matches.

Arilla was born in Barcelona.

References

1937 births
Tennis players from Barcelona
Spanish male tennis players
Tennis players from Catalonia
French Championships junior (tennis) champions
2021 deaths
Grand Slam (tennis) champions in boys' singles